Kobylisy is a Prague Metro station on Line C, located in the district of Kobylisy. The station was opened on 26 June 2004 as part of the Line C extension from Nádraží Holešovice to Ládví.

Gallery

References

External links 

 Gallery and information 

Prague Metro stations
Railway stations opened in 2004
2004 establishments in the Czech Republic
Railway stations in the Czech Republic opened in the 21st century